Neodorcadion fallax is a species of beetle in the family Cerambycidae. It was described by Kraatz in 1873. It is known from Greece.

References

Dorcadiini
Beetles described in 1873